is a Japanese child actress, who also records on Universal Music Japan.

Biography
Sugiyama was born in Kanagawa Prefecture, Japan.  In 2009, Sugiyama debuted on the Tokyo Broadcasting System drama, Kochira Katsushika-ku Kameari Kōen-mae Hashutsujo.

From March 28, 2011, to March 27, 2015, she became the fifth-generation One-san in the NHK Educational TV series, Inai Inai Baa!. Sugiyama is now in Wan Wan Wonderland from April 2015.

Her favorite food is Inari roll and sushi. Sugiyama had a difficulty with swimming. On 2013, she wanted to practice riding a bike.

On September 22, 2015, Sugiyama's CD debut was "Kama tte Yo! Ne".

Filmography

TV series

Drama

Films

Discography

Singles

References

External links
 
 

Japanese child actresses
2002 births
Living people
People from Kanagawa Prefecture